Nicola Mosti (born 7 February 1998) is an Italian professional footballer who plays as an attacking midfielder for  club Modena.

Club career

Juventus 
Born in Pietrasanta, Mosti was a youth product of Juventus.

Loan to Gavorrano 
On 20 July 2017, Mosti was loaned to Serie C side Gavorrano on a season-long loan deal. On 27 August, Mosti made his Serie C debut for Gavorrano as a starter in a 2–1 away defeat against Livorno, he was replaced Simone Zaccaria in the 77th minute. On 5 November, he scored his first professional goal, as a substitute, in the 91st minute of a 2–2 away draw against Monza. On 30 December he scored his second goal, again as a substitute, in the 88th minute of a 4–3 away defeat against Olbia. In January 2018 his loan was interrupted and he returned to Juventus, leaving Gavorrano with 15 appearances, two goals and one assist.

Loan to Viterbese 
On 27 January 2018, Mosti was signed by Serie C club Viterbese Castrense on a 6-month loan deal. Two weeks later, on 11 February, he made his Serie C debut for Viterbese as a substitute replacing Claudio De Sousa in the 87th minute of a 2–0 home win over Gavorrano. Five more weeks later, on 17 March, he played his first entire match for Viterbese Castrense, a 2–0 home win over Arezzo. Mosti ended his 6-month loan to Viterbese Castrense with only nine appearances, including six as a starter, and making 1 assist, however he didn't play an entire match during the second half of the season.

Loan to Imolese 
On 24 August 2018, Mosti was loaned to Serie C club Imolese on a season-long loan deal. On 18 September he made his Serie C debut for Imolese in a 0–0 home draw against AlbinoLeffe; he was replaced after 54 minutes by Michael De Marchi. On 21 October he scored his first goal for Imolese in the 29th minute of a 3–1 home win over Rimini. On 22 January 2019, Mosti scored his second goal in the 32nd minute of a 2–0 away win over Teramo. On 9 February he scored his third goal in the 18th minute of a 3–2 away win over Gubbio. On 31 March he played his first entire match for the club, a 2–1 home win over Triestina. Mosti ended his season-long loan to Imolese with 39 appearances, including 26 as a starter but he played only one entire match, scoring six goals and making four assists.

Loan to Monza 
On 2 August 2019, Mosti was loaned to Serie C club Monza on a season-long loan deal with option to purchase which could became obligatory if Monza reached the promotion in Serie B. On 25 August he made his debut for the club as a substitute replacing Cosimo Chiricò in the 78th minute of a 2–1 away win over Pro Patria. On 8 September he scored his first goal for the club as a substitute in the 91st minute of a 1–0 away win over Como. On 22 September he played his first match as a starter for the club and he also scored his second goal in the 49th minute of a 3–0 away win over Lecco. Mosti ended his season-long loan at Monza with 18 appearances, three goals, and one assist, helping the club win the Serie C and gain promotion to the Serie B after 19 years.

Monza 
After being promoted to the Serie B, Mosti became a Monza player outright.

Loan to Juventus U23 
On 1 October 2020, Mosti was loaned back to Juventus for one year with an option for purchase; he was sent to their reserve team Juventus U23 Mosti made his debut for the club two days later, as a substitute replacing Giacomo Vrioni for the last 19 minutes of a 2–1 away win over Giana Erminio. On 17 October, Mosti played his first match as a starter for the club, a 1–1 home draw against AlbinoLeffe, he was replaced by Michele Troiano in the 89th minute. On 17 January 2021 he scored his first goal for the club in the 63rd minute of a 1–1 home draw against Piacenza. However in late January 2021 his loan was interrupted and he return to Monza leaving Juventus U23 with 12 appearances, only 6 of them as a starter, and one goal.

Loan to Ascoli 
On 1 February 2021, Mosti was loaned to Ascoli on a six-month loan, with an option for purchase. Four days later, on 5 February he made his debut for the club as a substitute replacing Abdelhamid Sabiri in the 75th minute of a 2–1 away win over Lecce. Three weeks later, on 27 February, he scored his first goal for the club, as a substitute, in the 67th minute of a 1–1 away draw against Pordenone. On 2 March, Mosti played his first match as a starter for the club, a 2–0 home defeat against Pisa, he was replaced in the 46th minute by Soufiane Bidaoui. Mosti ended his loan with 9 appearances and 1 goal.

Loan to Modena 
On 16 July 2021, Mosti was sent on a one-year loan to Modena, with a conditional obligation to purchase. He made his debut on the first matchday of the season in a 0–0 draw against Grosseto. On 19 October, he scored his first goal for the club in a 2–1 away win over Pescara at Stadio Adriatico after an assist by Roberto Ogunseye.

Modena 
Following Modena's Serie B promotion in 2022, Mosti's obligation for purchase clause was triggered.

Career statistics

Club

Honours 
Monza
 Serie C Group A: 2019–20

References

External links
 

1998 births
Living people
People from Pietrasanta
Italian footballers
Association football midfielders
Serie B players
Serie C players
Empoli F.C. players
Juventus F.C. players
U.S. Gavorrano players
U.S. Viterbese 1908 players
Imolese Calcio 1919 players
A.C. Monza players
Juventus Next Gen players
Ascoli Calcio 1898 F.C. players
Modena F.C. 2018 players
Italy youth international footballers
Sportspeople from the Province of Lucca
Footballers from Tuscany